Mark Leonard Sander (born March 21, 1968) is an American former football linebacker who appeared in 12 games (2 starts) for the Miami Dolphins of the National Football League (NFL) in 1992.

References

Living people
1968 births
American football linebackers
Players of American football from Kentucky
Miami Dolphins players
Louisville Cardinals football players